Bela P. Zaboly (May 1910 – April 1985), a.k.a. Bill Zaboly, was an American cartoonist best known for his work on Thimble Theatre with Popeye. Zaboly's illustrated signature used the initials BZ with the "B" formed by the wings of a bee. In headings for Thimble Theatre, his typeset credit line was given as Bill Zaboly rather than Bela Zaboly.

Biography 
Born in Cleveland, Zaboly drew for his school paper in high school. After graduation, he was employed in the art department of the Cleveland-based syndicate, Newspaper Enterprise Association, where he started as an office boy and eventually was a staff cartoonist.

Early strips
As an illustrator, printmaker and painter, he exhibited in Cleveland and Chicago during the early 1930s, also creating the Sunday strip Otto Honk about moon-faced, dim-bulb Otto, who was variously employed as a private eye, movie stunt man and football player. Zaboly discontinued this strip in 1936. He was an assistant to Roy Crane on Wash Tubbs, and from 1936 to 1938 he drew Our Boarding House after Gene Ahern left NEA to do Room and Board for King Features Syndicate. Zaboly, his wife Irene and their son lived at 13609 Drexmore Road in
Cleveland.

Popeye
After Popeye creator E. C. Segar died in 1938, Thimble Theatre was scripted by Tom Sims. Doc Winner (1884–1956), who worked in the King Features bullpen, illustrated the strip until Zaboly took over in 1939. Zaboly and Sims produced the daily strip until 1954, and they worked on the Sunday strip until 1959. Ralph Stein began writing the daily in December 1954 with Zaboly as artist. Bud Sagendorf took control of both the daily and Sunday in 1958, although his work was not published until August (daily) and September (Sunday) of 1959. Zaboly also continued Segar's Sappo topper strip.

Zaboly made certain changes in the strip, notably replacing Swee'pea's nightgown with a small sailor suit, by the request of King Features. This change allowed Swee'pea to walk during the years 1957 to 1959. Sagendorf returned the character to his original appearance.

Zaboly's art was featured in several Popeye coloring books from the late 1950s through 1964 and in other licensed items during this period. These items included Popeye's Presto Paints (Kenner, 1961) and Popeye's Color and Re-Color Book (Jack Built-Toys, 1957) which used all of Zaboly's art.

The last Thimble Theatre daily by Zaboly was published August 8, 1959, with his Sunday strips continuing for a few months after that. With his Thimble Theater run ending, Zaboly returned to Cleveland, went back to work for NEA and also was an art salesman for the Alan Junkins Studio in Cleveland's Caxton building. He later attempted to launch his own syndicate without success.

Death
He died in 1985, aged 75.

Reprints
Much of Zaboly's work was reprinted in Four Color, Magic Comics, "Dagwood" and King Comics.

References

External links
 Art of the Print: Bela Zaboly
 "Older Swee'Pea"

American cartoonists
American comics artists
Popeye
1910 births
1985 deaths
Artists from Cleveland